Paul Romhany (born 25 October 1968) is a New Zealand-born magician best known for his Charlie Chaplin magic act.  He has been awarded many industry awards including the PCAM Gold Medal and the Variety Artists Club of New Zealand Top Variety Act award.  Paul has entertained the royal family of Monaco, performed at the famous Magic Castle in Hollywood, and appeared in over 100 countries.

Biography

Paul Romhany was born in 1968 in Auckland, New Zealand.  At the age of eight he saw his first Charlie Chaplin film, The Circus, attended a live magic show, and became interested in ventriloquism. He joined the Shore City Magicians Club, a magic club with a focus on youth.  At the age twelve Paul won his first talent quest and began to perform semi-professionally.

He graduated from Auckland University with a Bachelor of Music degree in 1990 and a Diploma in Teaching from Auckland Teachers Training College in 1991.

Paul's first break in showbusiness came when he toured New Zealand and Australia as part of the World Festival of Magic show alongside American performers Chuck Jones and Ricki Dunn, who became a lifelong friend and mentor.

After many years of experimenting with different performing styles and characters Paul decided to concentrate on a Charlie Chaplin silent magic act, for which he has become internationally known.

Paul has written over 24 books, including a best-selling book for the general public on cat readings.  Paul releases a new book each month as part of his Pro-Series range of books for magicians.  He has released over fifty original magic effects and routines, ranging from close-up to stage.  He regularly lectures to magic clubs, and consults for magicians for both television and stage.

In 2012 he created 'Vanish' magazine, a free downloadable trade magazine for magicians.  'Vanish' is read by over 80,000 magicians worldwide.

In June 2013 VanishLive was launched.  VanishLive is a daily roundup of magic news from around the globe plus articles and reviews of magic products, tricks, DVDs etc.

In October 2015 Paul Romhany was presented with the Grand Master of Magic Award, the highest honour for a New Zealand magician.

Awards and honours

 2015 Grand Master of Magic Award, New Zealand's highest honour for a magician
 2014 Robert Houdin Award, presented by Stevens Magic Emporium, Kansas, March 2013
 2012 Variety Artists Club of New Zealand Top Variety Act
 2003 PCAM Gold Medal, People's Choice Award
 1992 Variety Artists Club of New Zealand Rising Star Award

Publications

 The Real Deal - 2012
 Flown Away - 2012
 How To Tell Anybody's Personality By The Way They Laugh And Speak - 2011
 Briefcase Illusion - 2011
 Top Ten Travel Picks - 2011
 Performing Mentalism for Young Minds Vl. 2 - 2011
 Mental Epic Compendium - 2010
 Extreme Magic MakeOver - 2010
 Performing Mentalism for Young Minds Vl. 1- 2010
 Magic from Down Under - 2009
 Lunch Is Served - 2009
 Extreme Magic Makeover - 2009
 Entertaining On a Cruise Ship - Edition 1 - 2008
 Laughter in the Workplace - 2008
 Secrets of a Walk About Ventriloquist - 2004
 Pawmistry - 1998

Pro-Series Books :

 SwitchBoard Clipboard
 Winning Numbers
 Multiplying Bottles
 Signed Card on Blue Stake
 Bearly Impossible
 Bill 2 Can
 Color Change Hanky
 Headline Prediction
 Orange, Lemon, Egg & Canary
 Six Card Repeat

DVDs :

 Multiplying Bottles with DVD and Audio CD
 Romhany On Stage
 Lunch Date
 Minuette Aces

References

External links
 Paul Romhany Official Website
 Vanish Magazine
 Paul Romhany Interview on Talk Magic, June 2021
 Paul Romhany - Revolutionizing Live Performance and the Online Magazine, The Variety Artist Podcast, December 2018
 Romhany Report Blog
 Interview with The Magic Convention Guide, 2009
 iTricks Feature Article

New Zealand magicians
People from Auckland
Living people
University of Auckland alumni
1968 births